Miss Europe 1932 is the fifth annual Miss Europe contest and the fourth under French journalist Maurice de Waleffe. With only 15 European girls competing in this pageant, Miss Denmark, Aase Clausen won Miss Europe 1932.

Results

Placements

Delegates

 - Isabel Franck
 - Suzanne Dandin
 - Gwen Stallard 
 - Aase Clausen
 - Émilienne “Lyne” Caisson de Souza
 - Ruth Behnen
 - Ica Lampel

 - Rosetta Montali
 Paris' South American Colony - Ludmilla Riberio (of )
 -  Zofia Dobrowolska
 - Lilian Delescu
 (In exile) - Nina Pohl
 - Teresita Daniel
 -  Keriman Halis Hanem
 -  Olga Djouritch

National pageant notes

Debuts
Argentina, and Paris' South American Colony went for the first time ever.

Withdrawals
Austria, Estonia, and Holland

References

External links

Miss Europe
1932 in France